Meryl Jane Swanson (born 3 September 1970) is an Australian politician and former radio presenter. She is a member of the Australian Labor Party (ALP) and has represented the Division of Paterson in the Australian House of Representatives since the 2016 federal election.

Early life
Swanson was born on 3 September 1970 in Kurri Kurri, New South Wales. She grew up in nearby Heddon Greta. She holds the degrees of Bachelor of Commerce and Bachelor of Arts from the University of Newcastle. After graduating she worked in broadcasting for several years, as a researcher, producer and reporter for NBN Television and as a presenter with 2KO. She later worked as a business manager for the Hunter Region Organisation of Councils (1993–1996), as an electorate officer for Joel Fitzgibbon (1996–1997), and as executive director of Hunter Tourism (1997). After starting a family she operated a café for several years and then returned to radio with 2HD and 2NUR.

Politics
Swanson was elected to parliament at the 2016 federal election, winning the seat for the Labor Party following the retirement of incumbent Liberal MP Bob Baldwin. She was assisted by a favourable redistribution prior to the election. She retained the seat at the 2019 election despite a five-point swing against the ALP.

After the 2019 election, Swanson endorsed Joel Fitzgibbon for the leadership of the ALP, although he eventually decided not to stand. In August 2020 she was appointed Shadow Assistant Minister for Defence in Anthony Albanese's shadow ministry.

Political positions
Swanson is a member of the Labor Right faction. In March 2021 she "urged MPs [...] to be careful about the way they talked about taking action on climate change, arguing that coal workers should not feel demonised as Australia transitions to a low-emissions future".

Personal life
Swanson has two daughters with her husband Nick and lives on a  property in Buchanan.  she was a co-owner and director of Swanridge Investments Pty Ltd, which sells horse rugs.

References

 

1970 births
Living people
Members of the Australian House of Representatives
Members of the Australian House of Representatives for Paterson
Australian Labor Party members of the Parliament of Australia
Labor Right politicians
Women members of the Australian House of Representatives
21st-century Australian politicians
21st-century Australian women politicians
Australian radio presenters
Australian women radio presenters
University of Newcastle (Australia) alumni